Sānlíng (三陵) may refer to:

 Sanling Township, Handan County, Hebei, China
 Sanling Township, Ning'an, Heilongjiang, China